Askeptosauroidea is a superfamily of thalattosaurs, a Triassic group of marine reptiles. Askeptosauroidea is one of two major subgroups of Thalattosauria, the other being Thalattosauroidea. It includes the family Askeptosauridae and a more basal form called Endennasaurus.

Phylogeny
Below is a cladogram from Wu et al.  (2009) showing the phylogenetic relationships of Askeptosauroidea:

References

Thalattosaurs
Triassic first appearances
Triassic extinctions